Tjugum Church is a parish church of the Church of Norway in Sogndal Municipality in Vestland county, Norway. It is located just outside the village of Balestrand. It is one of two churches for the Balestrand parish which is part of the Sogn prosti (deanery) in the Diocese of Bjørgvin. The white, wooden church was built in an octagonal design in 1863 using plans drawn up by the architect Christian Henrik Grosch. The church seats about 320 people.

History
The earliest existing historical records of the church date back to the year 1323, but it was not new that year. The first church in Tjugum was a wooden stave church that was likely built during the 12th century. In 1610, the old church was torn down and replaced by a new timber-framed long church. The timber church from 1610 is shown in a painting from 1839 (see media gallery below). In 1696–1698, a  sacristy was added to the east of the choir.

This church was part of the Leikanger parish until 1 March 1849 when the new Balestrand parish was established. Tjugum Church was to be the main church for the parish, so a new, larger church was commissioned to be built. So in 1863, the old church was torn down and replaced by a new octagonal church on the same site. The new church was designed by Christian Henrik Grosch and the lead builder was Johannes Øvsthus. The new building was consecrated on 29 October 1863 by the local Dean Thomas Erichsen. In 1940, the church porch was enlarged and the second floor seating gallery was reduced in size.

Media gallery

See also
List of churches in Bjørgvin

References

Sogndal
Churches in Vestland
Wooden churches in Norway
Octagonal churches in Norway
19th-century Church of Norway church buildings
Churches completed in 1863
12th-century establishments in Norway